Big Top Evil is a 2019 American horror film written by John Morrisey and Sean Haitz, directed by Haitz and starring Haitz, Bill Moseley and J. Larose. 

The plot centers on Jay, on trial for murder and given a re-trial. He had been one of five friends out on a road trip when they encountered and were chased by a group of cannibal clowns. Jay was the only survivor and held responsible for the others' deaths; no bodies were found, having been devoured by the clowns.

Cast
Bill Moseley as Mr. Kharver
J. Larose as Roadside Jack
Sean Haitz as Jay
Chanté Demoustes as Veronica
Jisaura Cardinale as Casey
Cameron Hall as Scott
Morgan Ferreira as Donny
Grace Haitz as Kate
Chris Potter as Trevor
Austin Judd as Candy

Reception
Bobby LePire of Film Threat rated the film a 7 out of 10.

References

External links